Byrd Jazz is an album by trumpeter Donald Byrd recorded in Detroit in 1955 and originally released on Tom Wilson's Transition label. The album contains Byrd's first recordings as a leader (although the sessions that comprised Byrd's Eye View were released first), and was later re-released as First Flight on the Delmark label.

Reception

In his review for Allmusic, Scott Yanow stated "all of the music is straightahead and swinging. A fine beginning for the very interesting career of Donald Byrd". The Penguin Guide to Jazz criticized the recording quality, and rated Lateef's soloing as more authoritative than that of Byrd.

Track listing
All compositions by Donald Byrd except as indicated
 "Blues"  - 6:15    
 "Tortion Level" - 6:26    
 "Woody 'n' You" (Dizzy Gillespie) - 7:32    
 "Dancing in the Dark" (Howard Dietz, Arthur Schwartz) - 7:37 
 "Parisian Thoroughfare" (Bud Powell) - 14:26    
 "Yusef" (Barry Harris) - 5:36    
 "Shaw 'Nuff" (Ray Brown, Gil Fuller, Dizzy Gillespie) - 6:50

Personnel
Donald Byrd - trumpet
Bernard McKinney - euphonium
Yusef Lateef - tenor saxophone 
Barry Harris - piano
Alvin Jackson - bass 
Frank Gant- drums

References

Transition Records albums
Donald Byrd albums
1956 albums
Albums produced by Tom Wilson (record producer)